Alice Fisher may refer to:

 Alice Fisher (nurse) (1839–1888), nursing pioneer
 Alice S. Fisher (born 1967), assistant Attorney General in the United States Department of Justice

See also
 Alice Fischer (disambiguation)